Ravishankar Gowda (born 26 August 1973) is an Indian actor who works in the Kannada film industry. He is known mostly for his comic roles in television and films. He acted as Dr. Vittal Rao, in the sitcom Silli Lalli which aired on ETV Kannada.

Career
Gowda appeared in the very popular Kannada sitcom Silli Lalli, playing the role of Dr. Vittal Rao, that aired on ETV Kannada. It ran for over 1,100 episodes. Following this stint in television, he appeared in a lead role in the 2008 film, Payana. He performed in the 2012 film Snehitaru. In the film, he plays the role of a deaf character. His other movies are Nanjangud Nanjunda (2010), Akka Pakka (2013), Mangana Kaiyalli Manikya (2013) and Jai Lalitha (2014).

Personal life 
Gowda is from Mandya. He travelled to Bangalore in 1993 in search of opportunities to become a singer. He married Sangeetha, a singer, and daughter of singer Manjula Gururaj, in an Arya Samaj-style wedding in February 2003.

Filmography

Films

Television

References

External links
 

Living people
Male actors from Karnataka
Male actors in Kannada cinema
Indian male film actors
21st-century Indian male actors
Male actors in Kannada television
Indian male television actors
1973 births